Makena may refer to:

 Makena Onjerika, Kenyan writer and 2018 Caine Prize winner
 A brand name of hydroxyprogesterone caproate
 Makena, Hawaii, a census-designated place in Maui County, Hawaii
 Makena State Park
 Makena Beach & Golf Resort, a resort in Maui

See also
 McKenna (disambiguation)
 MacKenna (disambiguation)